"Fully Protected" is a legal protective designation administered by the California Department of Fish and Wildlife (CDFW), intended to conserve wildlife species that risk extinction within the state of California.

The classification of Fully Protected (often abbreviated as CFP) was the State's initial effort in the 1960s to identify and provide additional protection to those animals that were rare or faced possible extinction. Lists were created for fish, mammals, amphibians & reptiles,  and birds.

The Fish and Game Code sections dealing with Fully Protected species state that these species "....may not be taken or possessed at any time and no provision of this code or any other law shall be construed to authorize the issuance of permits or licenses to take any
fully protected" species, although take may be authorized for necessary scientific research.
This language arguably makes the "Fully Protected" designation the strongest and most restrictive regarding the "take" of these species. In 2003 the code sections dealing with fully protected species were amended to allow CDFG to authorize take resulting from recovery activities for state-listed species.

California laws relating to fully protected species were among the first attempts in the nation to give protection to wildlife in risk of extinction, predating even the Federal Endangered Species Act (ESA).  In the decades that followed, new laws were enacted that were more flexible to the needs of growing communities and the modern world.  Thus, most fully protected species have also been given additional protection under more recent laws and regulations, and many have been listed under state and federal versions of the ESA.  However, the laws relating to fully protected species are still in place.  As mentioned above, California law states that no permit may be issued for take of fully protected species, under almost any circumstances.  Thus, presence of a fully protected animal in an area such as a construction zone can literally bring the entire project to a halt.  In contrast, the ESA carries stronger penalties, but has provisions built in for mitigation options in the event of unavoidable take.  There is debate within conservation biology circles as to the modern-day applicability of the fully protected designation due to its inflexibility, the fact that new conservation laws have been enacted, and the fact that some fully protected species have undergone moderate population recovery while many other species that deserve the fully protected status have not been designated as such.

References 

Environment of California

Nature conservation in the United States
United States state environmental legislation
Wildlife law